The North Denver News is a monthly community newspaper that claimed to once reach 35,000 readers in the Denver neighborhoods of West Highland, Highland, Berkeley, Sloan's Lake, Sunnyside and Jefferson Park in north Denver. The newspaper is no longer being delivered to any residents in North Denver.

The paper seeks to produce a diverse community of voices covering local politics, education, lifestyles, art, and culture. It features the work of more than 20 writers each month. It was first started in 2003 to support the candidacy of Dick Garcia for City Council.

The paper features monthly columns by City Councilman Rick Garcia and Colorado House Speaker Andrew Romanoff. Award-winning historic house features by Corrine Hunt and Fran Schroeder have drawn wide acclaim.

The newspaper received widespread attention in August 2007 when it published a hoax story about a man who supposedly had his thumbs modified by plastic surgery to make it easier for him to use the iPhone. The fake story, which the North Denver News later said had been intended as satire, was widely republished. One blog that republished the story was quoted as stating that its publication in August, rather than on April Fool's Day, initially gave it credibility.

References

External links
 North Denver News website

Newspapers published in Colorado